Merophyas immersana is a species of moth of the family Tortricidae. It is found in Australia, where it has been recorded from New South Wales, Victoria and Tasmania. The habitat consists of open areas, including pastures.

The wingspan is about 14 mm.

The larvae feed on Trifolium (including Trifolium repens), Lupinus and Malva species.

References

	

Moths described in 1863
Archipini